National Highway 369E, commonly referred to as NH 369E is a national highway in India. It is a secondary route of National Highway 69.  NH-369E runs in the state of Karnataka in India.

Route 
NH369E connects Sagar, Huvinahalli, Holebaglu, Kalasavalli, Sighanadoor and Marakutuka in the state of Karnataka.

Junctions  
 
  Terminal near Sagar.
  Terminal near  Markutuka.

See also 
 List of National Highways in India
 List of National Highways in India by state

References

External links 

 NH 369E on OpenStreetMap

National highways in India
National Highways in Karnataka